Systemic acquired resistance (SAR) is a "whole-plant" resistance response that occurs following an earlier localized exposure to a pathogen. SAR is analogous to the innate immune system found in animals, and although there are many shared aspects between the two systems, it is thought to be a result of convergent evolution. The systemic acquired resistance response is dependent on the plant hormone, salicylic acid.

Discovery 
While, it has been recognized since at least the 1930s that plants have some kind of induced immunity to pathogens, the modern study of systemic acquired resistance began in the 1980s when the invention of new tools allowed scientists to probe the molecular mechanisms of SAR. A number of 'marker genes' were characterized in the 80s and 90s which are strongly induced as part of the SAR response. These pathogenesis-related proteins (PR) belong to a number of different protein families. While there is substantial overlap, the spectrum of PR proteins expressed in a particular plant species is variable. It was noticed in the early 1990s that levels of salicylic acid (SA) increased dramatically in tobacco and cucumber upon infection. This pattern has been replicated in many other species since then. Further studies showed that SAR can also be induced by exogenous SA application and that transgenic Arabidopsis plants expressing a bacterial salicylate hydroxylase gene are unable to accumulate SA or mount an appropriate defensive response to a variety of pathogens.

The first plant receptors of conserved microbial signatures were identified in rice (XA21, 1995) and in Arabidopsis (FLS2, 2000).

Mechanism 
Plants have several immunity mechanisms to deal with infections and stress. When they are infected with pathogens the immune system recognizes called pathogen-associated molecular patterns (PAMPs), it is via pattern recognition receptors (PRRs). This induces a PAMP-triggered immunity (PTI). Some pathogens carry effectors that suppress PTI in the plant and induce effector triggered susceptibility (ETS). In response, plants evolve resistance (R) genes that encode for proteins capable of recognizing the newly developed pathogen effectors, resulting in what is called effector triggered immunity (ETI). ETI often results in a form of programmed cell death (PCD), called hypersensitive response (HR). Pathogens can then evolve and develop new effectors for overcoming ETI, to which plants can respond by developing new R genes capable of recognizing the pathogen effector, thereby providing a new ETI.  When PTI and ETI are activated in the local infected plant tissues, there is a signaling cascade that induces an immune response throughout the whole plant. This "whole plant" immune response is called systemic acquired resistance (SAR). SAR is characterized by accumulation of plant metabolites and genetic reprogramming both locally and systemically (surrounding  tissues that were not infected). Salicylic acid (SA) and N-hydroxypipecolic acid (NHP) are two metabolites that have been shown to accumulate during SAR. Plants with reduced or no production of SA and Pip (a precursor to NHP) have been shown to exhibit reduced or no SAR response following infection.

Use in disease control 
Unusually, the synthetic fungicide acibenzolar-S-methyl is not directly toxic to pathogens, but rather acts by inducing SAR in the crop plants to which it is applied. It is a propesticide — converted in-vivo into 1,2,3-benzothiadiazole-7-carboxylic acid by methyl salicylate esterase. Field trials have found that acibenzolar-S-methyl (also known as BSA) is effective at controlling some plant diseases, but may have little effect on others, especially fungal pathogens which may not be very susceptible to SAR.

See also 
 Plant disease resistance
 Hypersensitive response
 Phytopathology
 Plant-induced systemic resistance

References 

Chuanfu et al, A. (2011). Salicylic acid and its function in plant immunity.
Conrath, U. (2006). Systemic Acquired Resistance. Plant Signaling and Behavior.
Deng et al, C. (2003). Rapid Determination of Salicylic Acid in Plant Materials by Gas Chromatography–Mass Spectrometry. Chromatographia.
Holmes et al, E. C. (2019). An engineered pathway for N-hydroxy-pipecolic acid synthesis enhances systemic acquired resistance in tomato. Sci Signal.
Huang et al, W. (2020). Biosynthesis and Regulation of Salicylic Acid and N-Hydroxypipecolic Acid in Plant Immunity. Molecular Plant.

Further reading

External links 
 
 

Phytopathology
Plant physiology
Immune system